Beatrice Rosen (born Béatrice Rosenblatt) is a French-American actress. She is internationally known for her role in the film 2012 (2009).

Early life and education
Rosen was born in New York City and grew up in Paris where she started acting.

Career
Rosen has worked in films and television in the US, France and in the UK. 
She played Tamara in the Roland Emmerich film 2012.

Rosen played a role in the final season of the WB series Charmed as innocent Maya Holmes as Piper Halliwell's first new identity. She appeared in the fourth season of the WB series Smallville as Dawn Stiles, a girl who wanted desperately to be prom queen. She also portrayed Gabrielle la Claire, daughter of the French ambassador in the 2004 film Chasing Liberty, and Natascha, the prima ballerina and Bruce Wayne date, in Christopher Nolan's The Dark Knight. She appeared in Sharpe's Peril of the  Sharpe series in 2008. 
Rosen was a series regular on the comedy series Cuts in 2005–06 and, in 2015, on the Fox drama Backstrom as Nadia Paquet.

Rosen also played Marylin Monique in  David E. Kelley's legal drama Harry's Law during the 2010–11 television season.

In 2010 and 2011 Rosen was Lancel's  brand ambassador.

Filmography

References

External links 
 

Living people
American film actresses
American television actresses
Actresses from New York City
French film actresses
French television actresses
20th-century American actresses
20th-century French actresses
21st-century American actresses
21st-century French actresses
Year of birth missing (living people)